RFA Tiderace is a  replenishment tanker of the British Royal Fleet Auxiliary (RFA). Ordered from DSME in 2012, she was officially named on 1 December 2016 and was accepted by the Ministry of Defence in June 2017. Tiderace entered service on 2 August 2018.

Tiderace departed her builders in August 2017 bound for the United Kingdom. She arrived at A&P Falmouth, Cornwall on 25 September 2017 for final fitting out with sensitive military equipment prior to UK sea trials and entry into service in 2018.

Construction 

Tiderace is the second ship of her class and was ordered on 22 February 2012. Like her sister ships, she was built by DSME in South Korea with her fitting-out carried out by A&P Group in Falmouth, England. Her steel was first cut on 8 December 2014, prior to being laid down on 8 June 2015. On 10 November 2015, a fire broke out on an LPG carrier being built in the same drydock as Tiderace, killing a shipyard worker and injuring seven others. The incident did not cause any damage to Tiderace but it caused a delay of nearly three weeks. She was subsequently launched on 28 November 2015 and was officially named by her Lady Sponsor, Mrs Anita Lister, the wife of Royal Navy Vice Admiral Simon R Lister on 1 December 2016.

Builder's sea trials were carried out between 13 January and 29 June 2017. On completion of these, Tiderace sailed from South Korea for delivery to the United Kingdom via the Kanmon Straits of Japan, the United States naval bases in Yokosuka, Japan and San Diego, United States, the Panama Canal and Curaçao. She arrived in Falmouth, England on 24 September 2017 prior to entering drydock at A&P Falmouth for UK customisation, including the installation of armour, self-defence weaponry and communications systems. Following this, she began a series of capability assessment trials, replenishment at sea (RAS) trials and first-of-class flying trials which saw her first RAS with Royal Navy frigate  and her first flying trials with a Merlin Mk2 helicopter from 814 Naval Air Squadron. She officially joined the fleet on 3 August 2018 following a service of dedication in Portland.

Operational history 
In April 2019, Tiderace participated in Exercise Joint Warrior, a large-scale NATO military exercise held in Scotland. She joined a task force led by the Royal Navy's landing platform dock , which also included the destroyer , frigate , landing ship dock  and 3 Commando Brigade, Royal Marines.

In January 2020, Tiderace began a refit and maintenance period at the Cammell Laird shipyard in Birkenhead, England. Her six month refit involved "major and invasive" work, including the replacement of all four engine/generator funnel exhausts and an upgrade to her high-pressure saltwater fire-main. After her refit, she made a maiden call to Gibraltar.

References

External links

 

 

Tide-class tankers
2015 ships
Ships built by Daewoo Shipbuilding & Marine Engineering